The Komi Autonomous Soviet Socialist Republic, abbreviated as Komi ASSR (Komi and ), was an autonomous republic of the Russian SFSR within the Soviet Union, established in 1936 as successor of Komi-Zyryan Autonomous Oblast.

In 1991, it became the Komi Republic, a federal subject of Russia.

See also
First Secretary of the Komi Communist Party

States and territories established in 1936
Autonomous republics of the Russian Soviet Federative Socialist Republic
1936 establishments in the Soviet Union
1991 disestablishments in the Soviet Union

Former socialist republics
History of the Komi Republic